General Smirnov may refer to:

Ilya Smirnov (1887–1964), Soviet Red Army lieutenant general
Konstantin Smirnov (1854–1930), Imperial Russian Army lieutenant general
Mikhail Nikolayevich Smirnov (general) (1900–1967), Soviet Army major general
Sergei Mikhailovich Smirnov (born 1950), Russian Army general
Yuriy Smirnov (minister) (born 1948), Militsiya of Ukraine colonel general